Pan Am Flight 845/26 was a four-engined Boeing 377 Stratocruiser named Clipper United States and registered as N1032V. It departed Portland International Airport in Oregon on a flight to Honolulu International Airport in Hawaii on March 26, 1955. The aircraft was ditched. 

Approximately two hours after the aircraft ditched, the United States Navy attack transport  arrived on the scene and rescued the 19 survivors. Four people died.

The probable cause was failure of No. 3 propeller which caused the engine to detach and the aircraft to become uncontrollable.

The experience provided lessons that helped prevent any casualties in another ditching the following year, when Pan Am Flight 6 sank between Honolulu and San Francisco.

References
 ICAO Accident Digest Circular 50-AN/45 (92-96)
 "Hobbs v. Franklin life insurance" The Federal Reporter 1958-05-22

External links
 CAB Accident Investigation Report File No. 1-0039 U.S. Department of Transportation Archived Report - Civil Aeronautics Board
 

Aviation accidents and incidents in 1955
Airliner accidents and incidents caused by mechanical failure
Airliner accidents and incidents involving in-flight engine separations
845/26
Airliner accidents and incidents involving ditching
Accidents and incidents involving the Boeing 377
1955 in Oregon
Aviation accidents and incidents in Oregon
March 1955 events in the United States
Aviation accidents and incidents in the United States in 1955
Airliner accidents and incidents caused by engine failure